Bunkering is the supplying of fuel for use by ships (such fuel is referred to as bunker), including the logistics of loading and distributing the fuel among available shipboard tanks. A person dealing in trade of bunker (fuel) is called a bunker trader.

The term bunkering originated in the days of steamships, when coal was stored in bunkers. Nowadays, the term bunker is generally applied to the petroleum products stored in tanks, and bunkering to the practice and business of refueling ships. Bunkering operations take place at seaports and include the storage and provision of the bunker (ship fuels) to vessels.

Singapore is currently the largest bunkering port in the world.

Bunkering in maritime law 

In many maritime contracts, such as charterparties, contracts for carriage of goods by sea, and marine insurance policies, the ship-owner or ship operator is required to ensure that the ship is seaworthy. Seaworthiness requires not only that the ship be sound and properly crewed, but also that it be fully fuelled (or "bunkered") at the start of the voyage. If the ship operator wishes to bunker en route, this must be provided for in a written agreement, or the interruption of the voyage may be deemed to be deviation (a serious breach of contract). If the vessel runs out of fuel in mid-ocean, this also constitutes serious breach, allowing the insurer to cancel a policy and allowing a consignee to make a cargo claim. It may also lead to a salvage operation.

The International Maritime Organisation is an agency of the United Nations responsible for the prevention of marine pollution by ships. On 1 January 2020, the agency began enforcing the IMO 2020 regulation of MARPOL Annex VI to minimise bunkering's environmental impact.

"Bunkering" as theft

In countries such as Nigeria, "bunkering" also refers to the clandestine siphoning off or diverting of oil from pipelines and storage facilities. Such bunkering is often crudely carried out, causing both accidents and pollution.

References 

Storage tanks
Fuel containers